The Neutrino Factory is a proposed particle accelerator complex intended to measure in detail the properties of neutrinos, which are extremely weakly interacting fundamental particles that can travel in straight lines through normal matter for thousands of kilometres. Up until the 1990s, neutrinos were assumed to be massless, but experimental results from searches for solar neutrinos (those produced in the Sun's core) and others are inconsistent with this assumption, and thus indicate that the neutrino does have a very small mass (see Solar neutrino problem).

Function
The Neutrino Factory will create a fairly focused beam of neutrinos at one site on the Earth and fire it downwards, probably in two beams emitted in different directions from a racetrack shaped underground muon storage ring, until the beams resurface at other points. One example could be a complex in the UK sending beams to Japan (see Super-Kamiokande) and Italy (LNGS). The properties of the neutrinos will be examined at the remote sites to determine how neutrinos evolve over time. This will provide information about their masses and weak interaction properties.

The project is currently in the conceptual design stage. An international "Scoping Study" was completed in 2007 and an international effort to write a design report has now begun.

Associated design efforts

International Design Study
The International Design Study seeks to present a design report for the Neutrino Factory that details the physics performance, schedule and costs by 2012. The study will include contributions from all regions in a combined Reference Design Report.

UK Neutrino Factory
There is a United Kingdom Neutrino Factory group.

U. S. Muon Accelerator Program
In 2010, the Muon Accelerator Program (MAP) unified the United States Department of Energy research support for Muon Colliders and Neutrino Factories. (Both projects involve producing muons and holding them in a storage ring, so there was much overlap.) The Muon Collider project is even more ambitious than the Neutrino Factory. In the Muon Collider, the muons will be inserted into a very high-energy collider ring, aiming to reach higher concentrations of energy than even the Large Hadron Collider (LHC) (first collisions produced in 2010) or perhaps even the Linear Collider Collaboration (LCC) experiments (design incomplete as of 2019.)

European Neutrino Group
CERN did a design study a few years ago, before effort moved on to the LHC. Activities in Europe continue with meetings and involvement in international experiments and collaborations.

Japanese design
This is based on an unusual type of accelerator called an Fixed Field Alternating Gradient (FFAG) that combines elements from the cyclotrons of the 1950s with modern automated magnet design processes, and new magnetic alloy radiofrequency accelerating gaps. The main advantage of these is that the magnetic fields are fixed and do not have to be synchronised to the beam in any way, yet the beam naturally moves into regions of higher field as its energy increases, allowing for very rapid acceleration without the difficulties found in very rapid-cycling synchrotrons.

See also 

 B-factory
 Higgs Factory

References

External links 
 International Muon Ionization Cooling Experiment
 

Particle physics facilities
Neutrino observatories
Proposed particle accelerators